Verbania-Pallanza railway station serves the city and comune of Verbania, in the Piedmont region, northwestern Italy.  Opened in 1905, it forms part of the Milan–Domodossola railway.

The station is currently managed by Rete Ferroviaria Italiana (RFI).  However, the commercial area of the passenger building is managed by Centostazioni.  Train services are operated by Trenitalia.  Each of these companies is a subsidiary of Ferrovie dello Stato (FS), Italy's state-owned rail company.

Location
Verbania-Pallanza railway station is situated in the Fondotoce district of Verbania.  It is sandwiched between Lake Mergozzo and the river Toce, just upstream from where the Toce flows into Lake Maggiore.

History
The station was opened on 16 January 1905, together with the rest of the Arona–Domodossola section of the Milan–Domodossola railway.

The composite name Verbania-Pallanza denotes the station's location within the borders of the former town of Pallanza, which, in 1939, was merged with Intra to form the current comune of Verbania.

Features
The station yard consists of three tracks. Two are operating lines, used by trains coming from the direction of Milan or from Domodossola, respectively.  The third is currently not used.  This configuration supports a smooth flow of passengers, primarily in the direction of Milan. As at January 2010, the station was not served by the EuroCity trains travelling between Milan and Domodossola.

Interchange
The station is interchange with the suburban bus line linking Verbania with Omegna, operated by VCO Trasporti.

See also

History of rail transport in Italy
List of railway stations in Piedmont
Rail transport in Italy
Railway stations in Italy

References

External links

This article is based upon a translation of the Italian language version as at December 2010.

Railway Station
Railway stations in the Province of Verbano-Cusio-Ossola
Railway stations opened in 1905
1905 establishments in Italy
Pallanza
Railway stations in Italy opened in the 20th century